Warren Barnes may refer to:

 Warren Barnes (swimmer) (born 1985), Canadian swimmer
 Warren Barnes (cricketer) (born 1992), South African-born New Zealand cricketer
 Warren Delabere Barnes (1865–1911), British colonial administrator